Snowboarding at the 2017 Winter Universiade was held at the Shymbulak Ski Resort from 30 January to 7 February 2017.

Men's events

Women's events

References

External links
Snowboarding at the 2017 Winter Universiade.
Results book

 
Snowboarding
Winter Universiade
2017